Andraegoidus is a genus of beetles in the family Cerambycidae, containing the following species:

 Andraegoidus cruentatus (Dupont, 1838)
 Andraegoidus distinguendus Huedepohl, 1985
 Andraegoidus fabricii (Dupont, 1838)
 Andraegoidus homoplatus (Dupont, 1838)
 Andraegoidus lacordairei (Dupont, 1838)
 Andraegoidus laticollis Tippmann, 1953
 Andraegoidus richteri (Bruch, 1908)
 Andraegoidus rufipes (Fabricius, 1787)
 Andraegoidus translucidus Botero & Monne, 2011
 Andraegoidus variegatus (Perty, 1832)

References

Trachyderini
Cerambycidae genera